Darren Cahill and Mark Kratzmann were the defending champions but they competed with different partners that year, Cahill with Mark Woodforde and Kratzmann with Glenn Layendecker.

Cahill and Woodforde lost in the semifinals to Neil Broad and Stefan Kruger.

Kratzmann and Layendecker lost in the final 6–2, 7–6 against Broad and Kruger.

Seeds

  Darren Cahill /  Mark Woodforde (semifinals)
  Brad Drewett /  Wally Masur (first round)
  Broderick Dyke /  Tom Nijssen (semifinals)
  Patrik Kühnen /  Udo Riglewski (first round)

Draw

External links
 1989 South Australian Open Doubles Draw

Dou